Andre Agassi defeated Lleyton Hewitt in the final, 6–3, 3–6, 6–2 to win the men's singles tennis title at the 2004 Cincinnati Masters.

Andy Roddick was the defending champion, but lost in the semifinals to Agassi.

Seeds 

  Roger Federer (first round)
  Andy Roddick (semifinals)
  Guillermo Coria (withdrew due to a right shoulder injury)
  Carlos Moyà (quarterfinals)
  Tim Henman (third round)
  David Nalbandian (withdrew due to an elbow injury)
  Juan Carlos Ferrero (second round)
  Rainer Schüttler (first round)
  Gastón Gaudio (second round)
  Lleyton Hewitt (final)
  Andre Agassi (champion)
  Sébastien Grosjean (first round)
  Nicolás Massú (first round)
  Marat Safin (quarterfinals)
  Paradorn Srichaphan (third round)
  Andrei Pavel (first round)
  Juan Ignacio Chela (third round)

Draw

Finals

Top half

Section 1

Section 2

Bottom half

Section 3

Section 4

References 
 2004 Western & Southern Financial Group Masters Draw

Singles